Clanculus aloysii is a species of sea snail, a marine gastropod mollusk in the family Trochidae, the top snails.

Description
The height of the shell varies between 8 mm and 9 mm, its diameter between 9 mm and 11 mm. The small, conical shell is carinated and umbilicated. it is whitish or corneous, marked above with zigzag radiating stripes (sometimes broken into dots) of sepia or black, below unicolored white or sparsely dotted with black. The peripheral carina is ornamented with a series of black spots. The spire is rather straightly conical with an acute apex and about six whorls. These are separated by subcanaliculate sutures  The upper surfaceis  spirally sculptured with about 6 coarse, conspicuously granose lirae, of which the first and the sixth (or peripheral) are most prominent. The base of the shell is slightly convex, bearing 6 to 7 concentric, coarse, conspicuously granose separated lirae. The aperture is rhomboidal. The outer lip is iridescent and plicate within. The basal margin is rounded and denticulate. The oblique columella is nearly straight, slightly folded above and bidentate at its base. The umbilicus has (in fully adult specimens) a crenate marginal rib, white within, and perforating scarcely deeper than the insertion of the columella.

Distribution
This marine species is endemic to Australia and occurs off New South Wales, Tasmania and Victoria.

References

 Tenison-Woods, J.E. 1876. Description of new Tasmanian shells. Papers and Proceedings of the Royal Society of Tasmania 1875: 134-162
 Tenison-Woods, J.E. 1879. Census; with brief descriptions of the marine shells of Tasmania and the adjacent islands. Proceedings of the Royal Society of Tasmania 1877: 26-57
 Tenison-Woods, J.E. 1879. On some new Tasmanian marine shells. Proceedings of the Royal Society of Tasmania 1878: 32-40
 Tate, R. & May, W.L. 1901. A revised census of the marine Mollusca of Tasmania. Proceedings of the Linnean Society of New South Wales 26(3): 344-471
 Pritchard, G.B. & Gatliff, J.H. 1902. Catalogue of the marine shells of Victoria. Part V. Proceedings of the Royal Society of Victoria 14(2): 85-138
 Chapman, F. & Gabriel, C.J. 1914. Descriptions of New and Rare fossils obtained by Deep Boring in the Mallee. ii. Mollusca. Proceedings of the Royal Society of Victoria XXVI: 301-330, 5 pl
 Hardy, G.H. 1916. List of the Tenison Woods types of recent molluscs in the Tasmanian Museum. Proceedings of the Royal Society of Tasmania 1915: 68 
 Hedley, C. 1917. Studies on Australian Mollusca. Part XIII. Proceedings of the Linnean Society of New South Wales 41: 680-719 
 Hedley, C. 1918. A checklist of the marine fauna of New South Wales. Part 1. Journal and Proceedings of the Royal Society of New South Wales 51: M1-M120
 Cotton, B.C. & Godfrey, F.K. 1934. South Australian Shells. Part 11. South Australian Naturalist 15(3): 77-92
 Iredale, T. & McMichael, D.F. 1962. A reference list of the marine Mollusca of New South Wales. Memoirs of the Australian Museum 11: 1-109
 Macpherson, J.H. & Gabriel, C.J. 1962. Marine Molluscs of Victoria. Melbourne : Melbourne University Press & National Museum of Victoria 475 pp.
 Macpherson, J.H. 1966. Port Philip Survey 1957-1963. Memoirs of the National Museum of Victoria, Melbourne 27: 201-288
 Wilson B. (1993) Australian marine shells. Prosobranch gastropods. Vol. 1. Odyssey Publishing, Kallaroo, Western Australia, 408 pp
 Jansen, P. 1995. A review of the genus Clanculus Montfort, 1810 (Gastropoda: Trochidae) in Australia, with description of a new subspecies and the introduction of a nomen novum. Vita Marina 43(1-2): 39-62

External links
 To Biodiversity Heritage Library (7 publications)
 To World Register of Marine Species
 

aloysii
Gastropods of Australia
Gastropods described in 1876